Christophe Noppe (born 29 November 1994 in Oudenaarde) is a Belgian cyclist, who currently rides for UCI WorldTeam .

Major results

2014
 9th Omloop van het Waasland
2015
 7th Kattekoers
2016
 3rd Rund um den Finanzplatz Eschborn-Frankfurt U23
 7th Paris–Troyes
 8th Grand Prix de la ville de Pérenchies
2017
 1st De Kustpijl
 4th Circuit de Wallonie
 6th Grand Prix de la Ville de Lillers
 9th Tacx Pro Classic
 9th Nationale Sluitingsprijs
2018
 3rd Schaal Sels
 8th Dwars door West–Vlaanderen
2019
 3rd Grote Prijs Stad Zottegem
 4th Trofeo Palma
 4th Antwerpse Havenpijl
 4th Grote Prijs Jef Scherens
 5th Tacx Pro Classic
 5th Omloop Mandel-Leie-Schelde
 7th Münsterland Giro
 8th Schaal Sels
 9th Famenne Ardenne Classic
 10th Grote Prijs Marcel Kint
2020
 8th Grote Prijs Jean-Pierre Monseré
2021
 3rd Trofeo Alcúdia–Port d'Alcúdia
 4th Egmont Cycling Race
 6th Binche–Chimay–Binche
2022
 5th Memorial Rik Van Steenbergen
 10th Elfstedenronde
2023
 9th Nokere Koerse

References

External links

1994 births
Living people
Belgian male cyclists
People from Oudenaarde
Cyclists from East Flanders
21st-century Belgian people